Richard Jupp (1728 – 17 April 1799) was an 18th-century English architect, particularly associated with buildings in and around London. He served for many years (c. 1755 – 1799) as surveyor to the British East India Company.

Works 
His work included:
 alterations to St Matthias Old Church, Poplar, London (1755)
 Manor House, (Old Road, Lee, London (1772) - now a Grade II listed building) – built for a wealthy London West India merchant, Thomas Lucas, president of Guy's Hospital, but bought in 1796 by Sir Francis Baring, founder of Barings Bank, it is now used as a public library and its gardens have become a public park (Manor House Gardens).
 Mansion at Painshill Park, near Cobham, Surrey (1774)
 Entrance and wings of Guy's Hospital, London (1774–1777)
 Wilton Park House, near Beaconsfield (c. 1780)
 a folly, Severndroog Castle (built as a memorial to Commodore Sir William James – a former chairman of the East India Company), on Shooter's Hill in south-east London (1784).
 East India House, Leadenhall Street, London (1796–1799 - the project was carried out after Jupp's death by his successor, Henry Holland)

Death 
Jupp died at his house in King's Road (now Theobald's Road), Bedford Row, on 17 April 1799.

References

External links
Lee Manor Society (PDF)

1728 births
1799 deaths
18th-century English architects
British East India Company people